394 Arduina (prov. designation:  or ) is an asteroid from the central regions of the asteroid belt. It was discovered by A. Borrelly on 19 November 1894 in Marseilles.

References

External links
 
 

000394
Discoveries by Alphonse Borrelly
Named minor planets
000394
000394
18941119